The men's ISSF Olympic trap event at the 2020 Summer Olympics took  place on 28 and 29 July 2021 at the Asaka Shooting Range. Approximately 30 sport shooters from 20 nations are expected to compete in the trap, with the precise number depending on how many shooters compete in multiple events.

Background

This will be the 23rd appearance of the men's Olympic trap event. The event was held at every Summer Olympics from 1896 to 1924 (except 1904, when no shooting events were held) and from 1952 to 2016; it was open to women from 1968 to 1992.

Of the six semifinalists from 2016, none have yet been announced as a returning competitor. 2016 gold medalist Josip Glasnović of Croatia and bronze medalist David Kostelecký of the Czech Republic have earned qualifying places for their nations, but the nations have not announced who they have selected to compete. Silver medalist (and 2000–2008 medalist) Giovanni Pellielo and sixth-place finisher (and 2012 silver medalist Massimo Fabbrizi are from Italy, which has earned a qualifying place but has not announced its selectee. 

World champions since the 2016 Games have been Daniele Resca of Italy (2017), Alberto Fernández of Spain (2018), and Matthew Coward-Holley of Great Britain (2019). Coward-Holley has been named as one of Great Britain's two competitors. Italy and Spain have not announced their competitors. 

No nations among those qualified are making their debut in the event. Great Britain has earned qualifying spots and is expected to make its 21st appearance, most of any nation.

Qualification

Each National Olympic Committee (NOC) can enter up to two shooters if the NOC earns enough quota sports or has enough double starter-qualified shooters. To compete, a shooter needs a quota spot and to achieve a Minimum Qualification Score (MQS). Once a shooter is using a quota spot in any shooting event, they can enter any other shooting event for which they have achieved the MQS as well (a double starter qualification). There are 29 quota spots available for the trap. They are: 4 for the 2018 World Championships, 8 for 2019 World Cup events, 13 from continental events (4 from Europe, 4 from the Americas, 3 from Asia, and 1 each from Africa and Oceania), 1 for the host nation (Japan), 2 from Tripartite Commission invitations, and 1 from world ranking. 

The MQS for the men's trap for 2020 is 112.

The COVID-19 pandemic delayed some of the events for qualifying for shooting, though many had been complete before the effects were felt.

Competition format
The competition will not continue to use the format introduced in 2016, with a qualifying round, semifinal, and finals. Instead, only qualification and final round remain.

In the qualifier, each shooter fires 5 sets of 25 targets in trap shooting, with 10 targets being thrown to the left, 10 to the right, and 5 straight-away in each set. The shooters can take two shots at each target. Six shooters advance to the final round.

The final round consists of 25 targets, after which a shooter with lowest number of successful shots is eliminated (placing 6th in the overall competition standings). Then one shooter is eliminated after each round of 5 shots until only 2 shooters remain. The last two shooters then take 10 shots, making it 50 shots in total. Only one shot can be taken at each target in the final round.

Ties are broken using a shoot-off; additional shots are fired one at a time until there is no longer a tie.

Records

Prior to this competition, the existing world and Olympic records were as follows.

Schedule

The competition is held over two days, Wednesday, 28 July and Thursday, 29 July. The first part of the qualifying round is the first day (75 shots); the second part of the qualifying round (50 shots) as well as the final round is on the second day.

All times are Japan Standard Time (UTC+9)

Results

Qualification

Final

References

Shooting at the 2020 Summer Olympics
Trap at the Olympics
Men's events at the 2020 Summer Olympics